Stolniceni is a village in Edineț District, Moldova. It is about 100 mi (or 161 km) North-West of Chişinău, the country's capital city.

References

Villages of Edineț District